A Woman Can Change Her Mind is a 2012 Jill Johnson studio album.

Track listing
A Woman Can Change Her Mind
The Chill
Fast Trip Up
Jacked Up Heart
Are You Feeling It Now
Over a Man
Scene of the Crime
The Whiskey’s Working
Hurting Out Loud
That Boy Is a Long Story
Nobody’s Getting Out of This Love
Looking for Home
White Lightning
Come Wake Me Up (with Rascal Flatts)

Charts

Weekly charts

Year-end charts

References

2012 albums
Jill Johnson albums